The 1930 Western Wall Commission, also Wailing Wall Commission, was a commission appointed by the British government, under their responsibilities in the Mandate for Palestine, in response to the 1929 Palestine riots. The commission was intended "to determine the rights and claims of Muslims and Jews in connection with the Western or Wailing Wall," and determine the causes of the violence and prevent it in the future. The League of Nations approved the commission on condition that the members were not British.

Jewish requests to the commission
The Jews requested that the Commission take the following actions:
 To give recognition to the immemorial claim that the Wailing Wall is a Holy Place for the Jews, not only for the Jews in Palestine, but also for the Jews of the whole world.
 To decree that the Jews shall have the right of access to the Wall for devotion and for prayers in accordance with their ritual without interference or interruption.
 To decree that it shall be permissible to continue the Jewish services under the conditions of decency and decorum characteristic of a sacred custom that has been carried on for many centuries without infringement upon the religious rights of others.
 To decree that the drawing up of any regulations that may be necessary as to such devotions and prayers, shall be entrusted to the Rabbinate of Palestine, who shall thus re-assume full responsibility in that matter, in discharge of which responsibility they may consult the Rabbinate of the world.
 To suggest, if the Commissioners approve of the plan, to the Mandatory Power that it should make the necessary arrangements by which the properties now occupied by the Moghrabi Waqf might be vacated, the Waqf authorities accepting in lieu of them certain new buildings to be erected upon some eligible site in Jerusalem, so that the charitable purpose, for which this Waqf was given, may still be fulfilled.

David Yellin, Head of the Hebrew Teachers Seminary, member of the Ottoman parliament, and one of the first public figures to join the Zionist movement openly, testified before the commission. He stated:

"Being judged before you today stands a nation that has been deprived of everything that is dear and sacred to it from its emergence in its own land – the graves of its patriarchs, the graves of its great kings, the graves of its holy prophets and, above all, the site of its glorious Temple. Everything has been taken from it and of all the witnesses to its sanctity, only one vestige remains – one side of a tiny portion of a wall, which, on one side, borders the place of its former Temple. In front of this bare stone wall, that nation stands under the open sky, in the heat of summer and in the rains of winter, and pours out its heart to its God in heaven."

Conclusions
The commission arrived at two primary conclusions:
A. To the Moslems belong the sole ownership of, and the sole proprietary right to, the Western Wall, seeing that it forms an integral part of the Haram-esh-Sherif area, which is a Waqf property.
B. The Jews shall have free access to the Western Wall for the purpose of devotions at all times subject to the explicit stipulations hereinafter to be mentioned

The report then went on to stipulate in detail which actions of the Moslems and Jews which should and should not be permitted.

The Commission noted that 'the Jews do not claim any proprietorship to the Wall or to the Pavement in front of it (concluding speech of Jewish Counsel, Minutes, page 908).'

The Commission concluded that the wall, and the adjacent pavement and Moroccan Quarter, were solely owned by the Muslim waqf. However, Jews had the right to "free access to the Western Wall for the purpose of devotions at all times", subject to some stipulations that limited which objects could be brought to the Wall and forbade the blowing of the shofar, which was made illegal. Muslims were forbidden to disrupt Jewish devotions by driving animals or other means.

The recommendations of the commission were brought into law by the Palestine (Western or Wailing Wall) Order in Council, 1931, which came into effect on June 8, 1931. Persons violating the law were liable to a fine of 50 pounds or imprisonment up to 6 months, or both.

Subsequent events
During the 1930s, at the conclusion of Yom Kippur, young Jews persistently flouted the shofar ban each year and blew the shofar resulting in their arrest and prosecution.

They were usually fined or sentenced to imprisonment for three to six months.

References

1930 documents
1930 in Mandatory Palestine
Organizations established in 1930
Western Wall
Documents of Mandatory Palestine
Freedom of religion